John Dorrington Apthorp  (born 25 April 1935) is a British businessman specializing in frozen food and alcoholic beverages, as well as a philanthropist.

Career 
He first enjoyed success as a founding member and managing director of the family business of frozen food stores Bejam, which became a market leader in the United Kingdom, trading from hundreds of stores across the country. In 1989, Apthorp sold the company, which was still doing very well, to its rival Iceland. He also co-founded Wizard Wines (now Majestic Wines), a chain of off-licences.

It was reported in both 2002 and 2003 (and again in 2009) that the wealth of Apthorp and his family was over £100 million. In 2015 the specialist magazine SelectUS Wines reported that his wealth has been maintained despite an overall decline in company revenues.

Already an Officer of the Order of the British Empire (OBE), Apthorp was appointed Commander of the Order of the British Empire (CBE) in the 2014 New Year Honours for charitable services, particularly in Hertfordshire.

He was a councillor for Edgware from 1968 to 1974, and was given "Freedom of the Borough of Barnet" in 2008.

He was previously a trustee of the Milly Apthorp Charitable trust, which is now closed. He now runs the John Apthorp Charity, which funds projects in Hertfordshire, Bedfordshire, and Buckinghamshire.

Notes

External links 

 John Apthorp Charity

1935 births
Living people
British businesspeople
British retail company founders
Commanders of the Order of the British Empire